Legacy is the second studio album by Nigerian singer Duncan Mighty. It was released on January 19, 2011.

Background

The 15-track album has a running time of 64 minutes and it features no one.

Singles 

Obianuju was a single in the album. The song takes its name from Duncan Mighty's love interest as he tells a story of his feelings, channeling the right emotions to deliver a classic record.

Track listing

Reception 
The album was a hit in Nigeria and other neighbouring countries.

See also 

 Music of Port Harcourt

References 

Duncan Mighty albums
2010 albums